Louise of Saxe-Gotha-Altenburg (9 March 1756 – 1 January 1808) was Duchess consort of Mecklenburg-Schwerin through her marriage to Frederick Francis I, Grand Duke of Mecklenburg, Louise was also a member of the House of Mecklenburg.

Life
Louise was the fourth and youngest child of Prince John August of Saxe-Gotha-Altenburg and Countess Louise Reuss of Schleiz. After the death of her mother in 1773, both she and her older sister Augusta inherited the title of co-Countess of Limpurg-Gaildorf as one of the several heirs of William Henry, Schenk of Limpurg zu Gaildorf (d. 1690 without surviving male issue). Both sisters retained their portions of the Limpurg-Gaildorf inheritance (1/4 of Amt Gaildorf and 1/16 of the town of Gaildorf) until 1780, when they sold their share to Charles Eugene, Duke of Württemberg.

In Gotha on 1 June 1775, Louise married Frederick Francis, Hereditary Duke of Mecklenburg-Schwerin, eldest child and only son of Duke Ludwig of Mecklenburg-Schwerin and his wife Princess Charlotte Sophie of Saxe-Coburg-Saalfeld. They had six children:

Issue
Daughter (stillborn 7 May 1776), buried in the Schelfkirche St. Nikolai of Schwerin.
Son (stillborn 11 May 1777), buried in the Schelfkirche St. Nikolai of Schwerin.
Friedrich Ludwig (13 June 1778 – 29 November 1819).  He married Grand Duchess Elena Pavlovna of Russia, a daughter of Paul I of Russia and Sophie Marie Dorothea of Württemberg. They were parents of Paul Friedrich, Grand Duke of Mecklenburg-Schwerin. Paul Friedrich's oldest son was Frederick Francis II, Grand Duke of Mecklenburg-Schwerin (1823–1883), who succeeded as Grand Duke in 1842. Friedrich Franz's youngest child was Heinrich (1876–1934), who married Queen Wilhelmina of the Netherlands in 1901. Heinrich, as Prince consort of the Netherlands, became known as Prins Hendrik. His oldest granddaughter is Princess Beatrix of the Netherlands.
Louise Charlotte (19 November 1779 – 4 January 1801). Married Emil Leopold August, Duke of Saxe-Gotha-Altenburg. They were parents to Louise of Saxe-Gotha-Altenburg, mother of Prince Consort Albert, and hence ancestors of the British Royal Family.
Gustav Wilhelm (31 January 1781 – 10 January 1851).
Karl (2 July 1782 – 22 May 1833).
Charlotte Frederica (4 December 1784 – 13 July 1840). Married Christian VIII of Denmark. They were parents to Frederick VII of Denmark.
Adolf (18 December 1785 – 8 May 1821).

Ancestry

References

1756 births
1808 deaths
People from Stadtroda
House of Saxe-Gotha-Altenburg
House of Mecklenburg-Schwerin
Princesses of Saxe-Gotha-Altenburg
Duchesses of Mecklenburg-Schwerin